Tooley Creek is a small watercourse that drains into Lake Ontario near Darlington, Ontario.  It drains .

Groundwater discharge from the bluffs left from glacial Lake Iroquois feed the headwaters of Tooley Creek. 

Its watershed is bordered by the watersheds of three other watercourses, Darlington Creek, Farewell Creek and Robinson Creek.

References

Tributaries of Lake Ontario
Rivers of the Regional Municipality of Durham